Oxynoemacheilus namiri, the Levantine loach, is a species of ray-finned fish in the genus Oxynoemacheilus. This species is common and widespread in the drainage system of the Orontes in Turkey and Syria, as well as in coastal streams in Syria south of the border with Lebanon, where it can be found in springs, reservoirs, streams and rivers.

Footnotes 
 

namiri
Taxa named by Friedhelm Krupp
Taxa named by Wolfgang Schneider
Fish described in 1991